= CalSO =

CalSO or Calso may refer to

- California Standard Oil, now Chevron Corporation
- California Student Orientation at University of California, Berkeley
